Clémentine Delait (5 March 1865 – 5 April 1939) was a French bearded lady who kept a café. She has been described by contemporaries as "the most illustrious and celebrated bearded lady in France" and "the perfect example of a bearded lady".

Early life 
Clémentine Delait was born in 1865 in Thaon-les-Vosges, in Lorraine, France. At the age of 20 she married Paul Delait, a local baker, with who she opened a café in town. 

According to later accounts, Clémentine Delait was hirsute from an early age, but shaved regularly. This changed in 1900, when she visited a carnival and saw a bearded woman with an unimpressive stubble and boasted that she could grow a better beard herself. Her husband bet 500 francs to back her. The bet attracted many more customers to the Delaits' café and they changed the name to Le Café de La Femme à Barbe, "The café of the Bearded Woman".

Fame 
Delait began selling photographs and postcards of herself and became something of a celebrity. She began touring Europe, attracting great crowds in Paris and London. Her touring intensified after she became a widow in 1926.

In 1900 she took part in much publicized stunt during which she entered a lion cage and played cards with the lion tamer while inside, as legend has it, scaring the lions in the process. In 1904 she received special permission from the authorities to wear men's clothes at heir leisure, at a time when it was illegal for women to wear masculine garb. 

By all accounts, she was very proud of her beard and took great care of it. Charles Grossier, her former barber, claimed that Delait would "watch him like a hawk" whenever he would be trimming her beard. Grossier visited her three time per week to wash her beard with a special shampoo and claimed that "she took care of that beard, she washed it, she clucked over, she brushed it every day".

Legacy 
In the 1970s a museum dedicated to Clémentine Delait was opened in Thaon-les-Vosges.

References

Bearded women
1865 births
1939 deaths
People from Vosges (department)